Botnhamn is a village in Senja Municipality in Troms og Finnmark county, Norway. The village lies along the west side of the Stønnesbotn fjord. The population (2001) is 308. Botnhamn experiences warm summers and long, dark winters.

Botnhamn is an old farmyard mentioned in historical writings around 1370 under the name Stufunes. There are several archaeological discoveries from the Stone Age, Iron Age, and Middle Ages and the most known is The Silver Treasure of Botnhamn from approximately 1000 AD. The farmyard has probably been part of a chiefdom located on both sides of the outer Malangen fjord. In the 17th century, Botn was a bailiff estate in Balstad jurisdiction. Through the establishment of trading activity at the end of the 19th century, Botnhamn grew to become a center in Hillesøy municipality.

Botnhamn is today a vigorous village with the ferry service Malangenforbindelsen connecting the island of Senja with the island of Kvaløya. It makes the journey between Senja and Tromsø shorter with a crossing time of 45 minutes and driving time of 50 minutes.

References

External links
Read more about Botnhamn on Botnhamn.com
Ferry route departure times

Lenvik
Populated places of Arctic Norway
Villages in Troms
Senja